(born November 26, 1955) is a Japanese politician and the current mayor of Setagaya in Tokyo. In addition, he was a member of the House of Representatives for the Social Democratic Party until July 21, 2009.

Hosaka campaigned and won the mayor's job on an anti-nuclear platform in April 2011, just over a month after the Fukushima Daiichi nuclear disaster. According to The Wall Street Journal, Hosaka "is determined to turn this city ward of 840,000 people, the largest in Tokyo, into the front-runner of a movement that will put an end to Japan's reliance on atomic power and accelerate the use of renewable energy".

Hosaka opposes the death penalty, and held the position of secretary general of the Parliamentary League for the Abolition of the Death Penalty. He is also highly critical of continued Japanese moral panic against the Otaku subculture in the nation, with one notable case of criticism displayed against public and media related assumptions and gossip surrounding the incidents of November 17, 2004, when Kaoru Kobayashi murdered a 7-year-old girl.

In 2006 and 2007, Hosaka joined the gay parade in Tokyo. Mizuho Fukushima, then-leader of the Social Democratic Party, also joined the event him in 2007.

See also

Anti-nuclear power movement in Japan
Capital punishment in Japan
Shizuka Kamei
List of peace activists

References 

1955 births
Living people
Japanese anti–death penalty activists
Japanese anti–nuclear power activists
Japanese LGBT rights activists
Mayors of places in Tokyo
Members of the House of Representatives (Japan)
People from Sendai
Social Democratic Party (Japan) politicians
21st-century Japanese politicians